Kristen Doute (born February 17, 1983) is an American television personality, clothing designer, entrepreneur, actress and author. She is best known as a former main cast member of the Bravo reality television series Vanderpump Rules.

Early life
Doute was born and raised in Dearborn, Michigan in Metro Detroit. She is of Lebanese and Irish descent.

Career

Television 
As an aspiring actress, Doute began working as a server at Lisa Vanderpump's restaurant SUR in West Hollywood, California. There she was cast as an original series regular on Bravo TV's Vanderpump Rules, a spin-off of The Real Housewives of Beverly Hills. The series follows Vanderpump's employees as they work on building their futures in show business and become entangled in interpersonal drama. On June 9, 2020, it was announced that her option for Vanderpump Rules was not picked up, following accusations by co-star Faith Stowers, who claimed that Doute and co-star Stassi Schroeder filed a false police report against Stowers for a crime she did not commit.

Writing 
On October 21, 2019, it was announced that Doute's first book, He's Making You Crazy, a humorous autobiographical guide to relationships, would be published by Chicago Review Press on June 2, 2020. The book is a collaboration with Michele Alexander, co-author of How To Lose A Guy in 10 Days, which inspired the film of the same name starring Kate Hudson and Matthew McConaughey. Doute first reported she was working on the book in 2016.

Businesses 
In 2014 Doute launched a clothing line, James Mae, named after her nephew and niece. The line features graphic tees and sweatshirts for men and women, with classic and vintage rock and roll designs. Doute relaunched James Mae in 2019 with business partner Magen Mattox, maintaining a vintage rock aesthetic and expanding the product line.

In February 2019, Doute and her Vanderpump Rules co-stars, Schroeder and Katie Maloney, launched a pinot grigio wine in partnership with actor Stephen Amell's company Nocking Point Wines, called "Basic Witch Potion No. 1". Their second collaboration with Nocking Point Wines, a rosé called "Basic Witch Potion No. 2", was launched in June 2019.

Personal life
Doute is a vegetarian.
She also dated James Kennedy in 2015. Doute also hooked up with Jax Taylor when dating Tom Sandoval and Jax was dating Stassi Schroeder and Schroeder and Doute were best friends.

Filmography

Bibliography 
Doute, Kristen (with Michele Alexander). He's Making You Crazy. Chicago: Chicago Review Press, June 2020.

References

External links

1983 births
Living people
American people of Lebanese descent
American people of Irish descent
American television personalities
American women television personalities
American fashion designers
American fashion businesspeople
American women writers
21st-century American actresses
People from Dearborn, Michigan
American women fashion designers